O Negócio ( The business) is a Brazilian drama television series created by Luca Paiva Mello and Rodrigo Castilho, and written by Fabio Danesi, Camila Raffanti and Alexandre Soares Silva. It was produced by HBO Latin America in partnership with Mixer.

The series follows the lives of Karin, Luna, Magali and Mia, high-class call girls who stand out in the market. They have put in practice various marketing strategies that they have learned and, with this, not only conquered space in the market but also created the successful company "Oceano Azul".

Cast and characters

Main cast

Recurring cast

Release

Broadcast
O Négocio (aka El Negocio and The Business) began airing on 18 August 2013, on HBO Brasil and HBO Latin America. In September 2013, the series was renewed for its second season, which debuted on 24 August 2014. On 27 April 2015, the third season was announced. The premiere of the third season was confirmed for 24 April 2016. On 14 November 2016, it was officially announced the fourth and final season of O Negócio, which debuted on 18 March 2018. Seasons 1, 2 and 3 have 13 episodes and season 4 has 12 episodes.

In Portugal, the series began airing on 19 March 2018 on SIC Radical.

Reception

Critical response
The journalist André Santana from television critic website Observatório da televisão, stated "O Negócio was able to reinvent itself on each season, without losing sight of its initial story line... [and] the series was successful to explore its main theme in the prism of humor." He noted that "even with so many qualities, O Negócio did not escape a depletion of the formula. Therefore, the decision to finish the series at the fourth season was quite happy.", and concluded that "The story was closed at the right time, showing that the Brazilian series production on pay TV has already raised to high levels, and that the Brazilian Teledramaturgy, in general, has many paths to follow."

BuzzFeed published a list of their 26 non-American favorite TV shows and O Négocio was the only Brazilian production listed.

References

External links

2013 Brazilian television series debuts
2018 Brazilian television series endings
2010s Brazilian television series
Brazilian drama television series
Portuguese-language television shows
HBO Latin America original programming
Prostitution in Brazilian television
Television shows filmed in São Paulo (state)
Television shows set in São Paulo
Portuguese-language HBO original programming